is a novel by the Japanese author Yasunari Kawabata. It was originally serialized in a newspaper before eventually being compiled into a novel in 1930.

Plot
In the 1920s, Asakusa was to Tokyo what Montmartre had been to 1890s Paris, Alexanderplatz was to 1920s Berlin and Times Square was to be to 1940s New York. The Scarlet Gang of Asakusa describes the decadent allure of this entertainment district, where beggars and teenage prostitutes mixed with revue dancers and famous authors. Originally serialized in a Tokyo daily newspaper Tokyo Asahi between 20 December 1929 and February 16, 1930, this vibrant novel uses unorthodox, kinetic literary techniques to reflect the raw energy of Asakusa, seen through the eyes of a wandering narrator and the cast of mostly female juvenile delinquents who show him their way of life.

The original newspaper serialization was incomplete.  The remaining sections were published concurrently in two literary journals, Reconstruction (Kaizō, volume 12, number 9) and New Currents (Shinchō, volume 27, number 9).

Markedly different from Kawabata's later work, The Scarlet Gang of Asakusa was greatly influenced by Western modernism. The annotated edition of this novel, translated by Alisa Freedman, includes the original illustrations by Ota Saburo and a foreword and an afterword by Donald Richie.

References

1930 novels
Japanese-language novels
20th-century Japanese novels
Novels by Yasunari Kawabata
Novels first published in serial form
Novels set in Tokyo
Works originally published in Japanese newspapers
Asakusa